The Republic of China competed as Chinese Taipei at the 1996 Summer Olympics in Atlanta, United States.

Results by event

Archery

Chinese Taipei entered three women and three men in the archery competition. Two of the archers advanced to the third round, though the team's combined record was 5–8.

Women's Individual Competition:
 Lin Yi-Yin → Round of 16, 13th place (2-1)
 Lin Ya-Hua → Round of 32, 19th place (1-1)
 Yang Chun-Chi → Round of 64, 46th place (0-1)

Men's Individual Competition:
 Hsieh Sheng-Feng → Round of 16, 10th place (2-1)
 Cho Sheng-Ling → Round of 64, 41st place (0-1)
 Wu Tsung-Yi → Round of 64, 44th place (0-1)

Women's Team Competition:
 Lin, Lin, and Yang → Round of 16, 12th place (0-1)

Men's Team Competition:
 Hsieh, Cho, and Wu → Round of 16, 10th place (0-1)

Athletics
Men's Marathon
 Hsu Gi-Sheng — 2:23.04 (→ 57th place)

Men's Long Jump
 Nai Hui-Fang
 Qualification — 7.91m (→ did not advance)
 Chao Chih-Kuo
 Qualification — 7.67m (→ did not advance)

Women's 400m Hurdles
Hsu Pei-Chin
 Qualification — 58.80 (→ did not advance)

Boxing
Men's Light Flyweight (– 48 kg)
Tsai Chih-Hsiu
 First Round — Lost to Mansueto Velasco (Philippines) after referee stopped contest in first round

Diving
Men's 3m Springboard
Chen Han-Hung
 Preliminary Heat — 194.13 (→ did not advance, 37th place)

Sailing
Men's 470
Brady Sih and Bryant Sih

Softball

Women's team competition
Preliminary Round Robin
Lost to Canada (1:2)
Lost to Australia (0:4)
Defeated Netherlands (7:1)
Lost to United States (0:4)
Defeated Puerto Rico (2:10)
Lost to PR China (0:1)
Lost to Japan (1:5)
Semifinals
 Did not advance → Sixth place
Team Roster
Yen Show-tzu
Wang Ya-fen
Yang Hui-chun
Han Hsin-lin
Chien Pei-chi
Chiu Chen-ting
Chang Hsiao-ching
Tu Hui-ping
Chung Chiung-yao
Liu Tzu-hsin
Ou Ching-chieh
Liu Chia-chi
Tu Hui-mei
Chien Chen-ju
Lee Ming-chieh
Head coach: Wang Cheng-Fu

Swimming
Men's 100m Breaststroke
 Huang Chih-Yung
 Heat – 1:05.26 (→ did not advance, 33rd place)

Women's 50m Freestyle
 Lin Chien-Ju
 Heat – 27.00 (→ did not advance, 38th place)

Women's 100m Freestyle
 Chang Wei-Chia
 Heat – 58.49 (→ did not advance, 37th place)
 Tsai Shu-min
 Heat – 58.65 (→ did not advance, 41st place)

Women's 400m Freestyle
 Lin Chi-Chan
 Heat – 4:17.18
 B-Final – 4:15.74 (→ 11th place)

Women's 800m Freestyle
 Lin Chi-Chan
 Heat – 8:40.31 (→ did not advance, 9th place)

Women's 200m Butterfly
 Hsieh Shu-Tzu
 Heat – 2:16.27 (→ did not advance, 18th place)

Women's 400m Individual Medley
 Hsieh Shu-Tzu
 Heat – 5:01.70 (→ did not advance, 29th place)

Women's 4 × 100 m Freestyle Relay
 Chang Wei-Chia, Tsai Shu-min, Lin Chien-Ju, and Lin Chi-Chan 
 Heat – 3:56.39 (→ did not advance, 18th place)

Women's 4 × 200 m Freestyle Relay
 Tsai Shu-min, Chang Wei-Chia, Hsieh Shu-Ting, and Lin Chi-Chan 
 Heat – 8:27.61 (→ did not advance, 19th place)

Women's 4 × 100 m Medley Relay
 Lin Chien-Ju, Mou Ying-Hsin, Hsieh Shu-Ting, and Tsai Shu-min
 Heat – 4:38.90 (→ did not advance, 24th place)

Table Tennis 
Men's Singles Competition
 Chiang Peng-Lung (19 years old), rank 17
Men's Doubles Competition
 Chiang Peng-Lung and Wu Wen-Chia, rank 17

Women's Singles Competition
 Chen Jing (27 years old), rank 2 -  medal
Women's Doubles Competition
 Chen Jing and Chen Chiu-Tan, rank 5

Tennis
Men's Doubles Competition
 Chen Chih-jung and Lien Yu-Hui 
 First round — Lost to Claude N'Goran and Clement N'Goran (Ivory Coast) 2-6 2-6

Women's Singles Competition
 Wang Shi-ting
 First round — Defeated Adriana Serra-Zanetti (Spain) 7-5 7-6
 Second round — Lost to Mary Joe Fernandez (USA) 6-7 6-2 1-6

Weightlifting
Men's Light-Heavyweight
Wu Tsai-Fu
 Final — 137.5 + 175.0 = 312.5 (→ 14th place)
Kuo Tai-Chih
 Final — 125.0 + 165.0 = 290.0 (→ 16th place)

References
Official Olympic Reports
International Olympic Committee results database

Nations at the 1996 Summer Olympics
1996
1996 in Taiwanese sport